The Georgia national futsal team is controlled by the Georgian Football Federation, the governing body for futsal in Georgia and represents the country in international futsal competitions, such as the World Cup and the European Championships.

Tournament records

FIFA Futsal World Cup

UEFA European Futsal Championship

Players

Current squad
The following players were called up to the squad for the UEFA 2024 FIFA Futsal World Cup qualification matches against Belgium and Austria on 8 and 12 October 2022, respectively.
Caps and goals updated as of 12 October 2022, after the match against Austria.
Head coach: Avtandil Asatiani

Recent call-ups
The following players have also been called up to the squad within the last 12 months.

COV Player withdrew from the squad due to contracting COVID-19.
INJ Player withdrew from the squad due to an injury.
PRE Preliminary squad.
RET Retired from international futsal.

Georgia vs opponent

References

External links
https://web.archive.org/web/20150801172218/http://geofutsal.ge/
https://web.archive.org/web/20150317122110/http://gff.ge/ka
http://www.uefa.com/teamsandplayers/teams/futsalteama/team=757157/profile/index.html

Georgia
National sports teams of Georgia (country)
Futsal in Georgia (country)